Qasr is a village located in the Hermel District of the Baalbek-Hermel Governorate in Lebanon.

References

Populated places in Hermel District